George Hanks "Hank" Brown (born February 12, 1940) is an American politician and lawyer from Colorado. He is a former Republican politician and U.S. Senator. He served as the 21st president of the University of Colorado system from April 2005 to January 2008.

Education
Brown was born in Denver in 1940, and graduated from college in 1961 and from law school in 1969, both from the University of Colorado. Brown also has a Master of Laws degree from George Washington University. At the former, he became a member of Delta Tau Delta International Fraternity.

Career

Military
Brown served in the United States Navy from 1962 to 1966. He was an aviator and volunteered for service in Vietnam. He was decorated for his combat service as a forward air controller.

Politics

He served in the Colorado Senate from 1972 to 1976 and was elected to the United States House of Representatives in 1980, serving until 1991. In 1990, he was elected to the United States Senate in which he served one term and did not run again in the 1996 election. From 1998 to 2002, he was president of the University of Northern Colorado. Brown and his wife, Nan, live in Denver.

In 1995, Brown was involved with the Airstan incident in which he mediated efforts for a prisoner exchange between Russia and the Taliban, which ultimately broke down, but his efforts set up an escape by the Russian prisoners.

CU President
In April 2005, Brown was named to succeed Elizabeth Hoffman, as the president of the University of Colorado on an interim basis. Brown took office on August 1, 2005. Upon taking this role, he inherited a system weakened by sharply decreasing state appropriations, and scandals that included allegations of misuse of foundation funds, instances of sexual assault by members of the football team, waning public confidence, and sharp criticism in the state newspapers. He was later praised for the effective remedies he implemented for aggressively attacking these issues.

During his interim tenure, Brown also led the university through the controversy surrounding Ethnic Studies professor Ward Churchill.  An investigation of Churchill for academic misconduct which had been supported by American Council of Trustees and Alumni, an organization that Brown had co-founded in 1995, identified seven separate instances of misconduct and referred the matter to the university administration. Brown urged the Board of Regents to dismiss Churchill, which it did in March 2006, overriding a tenure committee recommendation for one-year suspension. The decision was met with mixed opinion.  Those in favor applauded the decision based on the findings of academic fraud, while those opposed believe the firing was simply a smokescreen to silence his views. In a July 2007 Wall Street Journal op-ed on the Churchill affair, Brown wrote: "Controversy -- especially self-sought controversy -- doesn't immunize a faculty member from adhering to professional standards."

In May 2006, the regents appointed Brown permanently. Later that year, he announced an initiative to add class rankings to student transcripts as a counterweight to grade inflation.

In 2007, CU set a fundraising record of $133 million, with some donors "credit[ing] Brown with restoring their confidence in the university."

Brown tendered his resignation January 18, 2007 and left his post effective March 10, 2008.

Other positions
Brown is a member of the board of the International Foundation for Electoral Systems, a non profit which supports international elections.

Bibliography
Hank Brown, John B. Cooney, and Michael B. Poliakoff, 'Openness, Transparency, and Accountability: Fostering Public Trust in Higher Education', in The Politically Correct University: Problems, Scope, and Reforms, Robert Maranto (ed.), Richard E. Redding (ed.), Frederick M. Hess (ed.), Washington, D.C.: The AEI Press, 2009

References

External links

CU president Hank Brown will receive the 2008 Citizen of the West award
Brown well-deserving of Citizen of the West honor
Brown for President
Brown Named To Newton Endowed Chair At CU-Boulder

|-

|-

|-

|-

|-

1940 births
Living people
Presidents of the University of Colorado System
University of Colorado alumni
Politicians from Denver
Republican Party Colorado state senators
United States Navy officers
United States Navy personnel of the Vietnam War
Republican Party United States senators from Colorado
Republican Party members of the United States House of Representatives from Colorado
George Washington University Law School alumni
20th-century American politicians
Arcadia University